The Ministry of the Interior of Czechoslovakia refers to the internal affairs ministry which was responsible for interior of Czechoslovakia during its existence, from 1918 to 1992.

List of ministers

First Czechoslovak Republic (1918–1938)

Second Czechoslovak Republic (1938–1939)

Czechoslovak government-in-exile (1940–1945)

Third Czechoslovak Republic (1945–1948)

Czechoslovak Socialist Republic (1948–1989)

Czech and Slovak Federative Republic (1989–1992)

See also
Ministry of the Interior (Czech Republic)
Ministry of the Interior (Slovakia)

External links
Czechoslovak ministries, etc – Rulers.org

Ministers of the Interior of Czechoslovakia
Czechoslovakia
1918 establishments in Czechoslovakia
1992 disestablishments in Czechoslovakia